Archangelos is a name of various towns and villages in Greece:
 Archangelos, Laconia, a village in Laconia
 Archangelos, Rhodes, a town in the island of Rhodes
 Archangelos, Preveza, a village in the regional unit of Preveza
 Archangelos, Pella, a town in the regional unit of Pella

See also
 Archangel (disambiguation)